Sodium-dependent phosphate transport protein 1 is a protein that in humans is encoded by the SLC17A1 gene.

See also
 Solute carrier family

References

Further reading

Solute carrier family